Once Upon a Bite is a Chinese television documentary series about culinary arts that premiered on October 28th, 2018 on Tencent Video.  The series is directed by Chen Xiaoqing, the director of A Bite of China.  

The first season premiered in 2018 consisted of 8 episodes.

The second season premiered on April 26th, 2020, also consisted of 8 episodes.

Series overview

Reception
Once Upon a Bite has received rave reviews from culinary enthusiasts and audiences.  Some have praised the series as equal to or even surpassing Chen Xiaoqing's previous A Bite of China.  The first season of Once Upon a Bite received a 9.0 out of 10 ratings on Douban with over a hundred thousand ratings. The second season received a 9.1 out of 10 ratings on Douban.  The first season also accumulated over 1 billion streaming views on Tencent Video, a record for food documentaries.

References

External links
  (season 1)
  (season 2)

2010s documentary television series
2020s documentary television series
Mandarin-language television shows
Chinese documentary television series
Chinese cuisine